William Boyland may refer to:

 William Boyland (Australian politician) (1885–1967), member of the Victorian Legislative Assembly
 William F. Boyland, New York assemblyman
 William Boyland Jr. (born 1970), his son, New York assemblyman